Omphacomeria is a genus of flowering plants belonging to the family Santalaceae. It is a dioecious shrub.

It is endemic to southeastern Australia. There is only one species, Omphacomeria acerba.

References

Santalaceae
Monotypic Santalales genera
Dioecious plants